Lachay National Reserve is a protected area in the region of Lima, Peru.

Climate 
Climate at the reserve is typical of the lomas: there is a wet season, from June to October (when vegetation develops) and a dry season from January to May (when the landscape is barren).

Ecology
The lomas ecosystem consists of areas of coastal desert, mostly hills, that receive enough moisture during winter for plant life to thrive, unlike the drought conditions in summer (except for some El Niño events, that bring rains in the summer).

Flora 
Among the native plant species present in the park are: Tara spinosa, Vasconcellea candicans, Ismene amancaes, Verbena litoralis, Vachellia macracantha, Heliotropium arborescens, Armatocereus matucanensis, etc.

Fauna

Some birds found in the reserve are: the vermilion flycatcher, the Andean tinamou, the American kestrel, the burrowing owl, etc.

Some mammals found here are: the Sechuran fox, the white-tailed deer, the Pampas cat, the puma, etc.

Archaeology
Pre-columbian archaeological remains have been found in the reserve such as: man-made terraces, cave paintings, tombs and pieces of pottery.

Recreation 
The main activities in the reserve are birdwatching and hiking. Campsites in the reserve have some amenities like picnic tables, outhouses, parking spots, etc.

Environmental issues 
The main environmental issues that threat the integrity of the reserve are: unregulated tourism, firewood extraction, cattle grazing, illegal mining (construction materials), four-wheel drive vehicles outside authorized roads, garbage (not only from visitors, but also from people who toss out garbage from vehicles on the Pan-American highway nearby), invasive species (including stray dogs) and archaeological looting.

References

External links
 Profile on Parkswatch.org

National Reservations of Peru
Geography of Lima Region
Protected areas established in 1977
Tourist attractions in Lima Region
1977 establishments in Peru